Kévin Farade (born 1 September 1995) is a French professional footballer who plays as a forward for Annecy.

Career
Farade is a product of the youth academies of FC Villiers-le-Bel and Guingamp. He began his senior career with the reserves of Guingamp in 2012, before moving to Paris Saint-Germain II in 2013. He followed that up with stints at Lusitanos Saint-Maur, Entente SSG and AF Bobigny. After a breakout season with Bobigny scoring 13 goals in 20 games, he moved to Créteil on 13 June 2020. After another successful stint with Créteil, he transferred to Annecy on 5 June 2022, as they were newly promoted into the Ligue 2. He made his professional debut with Annecy in a 2–1 Ligue 2 loss to Niort on 30 July 2022.

International career
Born in Metropolitan France, Farade is of Martiniquais descent. He was first called up to the Martinique national team in May 2022, but did not make an appearance due to administrative issues.

References

External links
 

1995 births
Living people
People from Villiers-le-Bel
French footballers
French people of Martiniquais descent
US Lusitanos Saint-Maur players
Entente SSG players
Football Club 93 Bobigny-Bagnolet-Gagny players
US Créteil-Lusitanos players
FC Annecy players
Ligue 2 players
Championnat National players
Championnat National 2 players
Championnat National 3 players
Association football forwards